Anon Nanok (born March 30, 1983), simply known as Do, is a retired football defender from Thailand. He also was a former player in Thailand national team who scored 1 goal for the national team.

Club career

Police United
Anon as assigned by head coach, Chaiyong. Was the team captain for the club Police United to take care of friends on either team. And off the field is important that the Police United. Back to the top league of the country again in 2010.

International goals

Honours

Club
Police United
 Thai Division 1 League Champions (1) : 2009

 Air Force AVIA
 Thai Division 1 League Champions (1) : 2013

External links
 Profile at Goal

References

1983 births
Living people
Anon Nanok
Anon Nanok
Association football defenders
Anon Nanok
Anon Nanok
Anon Nanok
Anon Nanok
Anon Nanok
Anon Nanok
Anon Nanok
Anon Nanok
Anon Nanok
Anon Nanok
Anon Nanok
Anon Nanok
Anon Nanok